Los Olivos District AVA is an American Viticultural Area located in Santa Barbara County, California established on January 20, 2016, by the Alcohol and Tobacco Tax and Trade Bureau (TTB).  It straddles the Santa Ynez Valley, formed by the Santa Ynez River, between the Purisima Hills above  Solvang. The area encompasses the townships of  Los Olivos, Ballard, Santa Ynez and Solvang. State Route 154, known locally as the San Marcos Pass Road or Chumash Highway, bisects the region accessing many of the wineries and vineyards as it traverses toward its destination in  Santa Barbara.

The Los Olivos District stretches over  where approximately twelve bonded wineries and forty-seven commercially-producing vineyards cultivate .  The district shares its western boundary with the eastern border of the Ballard Canyon AVA and its eastern boundary flanks the western perimeter of Happy Canyon of Santa Barbara AVA while not overlapping either AVA.  It is located within the  Santa Ynez Valley viticultural area and the larger, multi-county Central Coast  viticultural area.  The USDA plant hardiness zone for the AVA is 9b.

Terroir 
The distinguishing features of the Los Olivos District include its topography, soil, and climate. The AVA is located on a broad alluvial terrace plain of the Santa Ynez River.  The topography is relatively uniform, with nearly flat terrain that gently slopes southward toward the Santa Ynez River.  The lack of steeply sloped hills reduces the risk of erosion and facilitates mechanical tiling and harvesting in the vineyards. The open terrain allows its vineyards to receive uniform amounts of sunlight, rainfall, and temperature-moderating fog because there are no significant hills or mountains to block the rainfall and fog or shade the vineyards.

Climate
In this region, the temperatures are affected by cooling marine fog. The thin fog allows the daytime temperatures to rise higher and the nighttime temperatures to drop lower than in the regions farther to the west, where heavy fog is present throughout the day. The region to the east receives even less fog than Los Olivos, so daytime temperatures rise higher and nighttime temperatures drop lower. The warm daytime temperatures within the AVA encourage fruit maturation and sugar production, and the cool nighttime temperatures minimize acid loss.

Soil
Over 95 percent of the soils within the Los Olivos District are from the Positas-Ballard-Santa Ynez soil association and are derived from alluvium, including Orcutt sand and terrace deposits.  The soils are moderate to well-drained gravelly fine sandy loams and clay loams with low to moderate fertility. The soils drain quickly enough to reduce the risk of root disease but do not drain so excessively as to require frequent irrigation. Soil nutrient levels are adequate to produce healthy vines and fruit without promoting excessive growth. By contrast, the majority of soils in the surrounding regions are not from the Positas-Ballard-Santa Ynez soil association and are generally less fertile and drain faster.

Wine Industry 
TTB received the petition from C. Frederic Brander, owner, and winemaker of the Brander Vineyard, proposing the establishment of the “Los Olivos District” AVA in Santa Barbara County, California. There are twelve bonded wineries and approximately forty-seven commercially-producing vineyards cultivating  making it the largest concentration of vineyards in a sub-appellation with many of the valley’s heritage vineyards located here.  The grapes are principally Sauvignon Blanc, Cabernet Franc, Cabernet Sauvignon, and Rhone varietals take prominence, although the AVA also includes Spanish and Italian varietals.

References

External links
  Los Olivos District Santa Barbara Vintners Association
 Los Olivos District Winegrowers Alliance
  Santa Ynez Wine Country Association
  TTB AVA Map

 
 American Viticultural Areas of Southern California
 American Viticultural Areas
California wine
 Geography of Santa Barbara County, California
2016 establishments in California